This is a list of the world's best-selling albums of recorded music in physical mediums, such as vinyl, audio cassettes or compact disks. To appear on the list, the figure must have been published by a reliable source and the album must have sold at least 20 million copies. This list can contain any types of album, including studio albums, extended plays, greatest hits, compilations, various artists, soundtracks and remixes. The figures given do not take into account the resale of used albums.

All albums included on this list have their available claimed figures supported by at least 30% in certified copies. The percentage amount of certified sales needed increases the newer the album is, so albums released before 1975 are only expected to have their claimed figures supported by at least 30% in certified copies. However, newer albums, such as 21 and Come Away with Me, are expected to have their claimed figures supported by at least 70% in certified copies, this is because more music markets instituted certification systems after the 1980s and 1990s. Certified copies are sourced from available online databases of local music industry associations. The certified units percentage varies according to the first year that an artist appeared in the charts. This is the reason why albums that would otherwise make the list, such as The Sound of Music, In-A-Gadda-Da-Vida, Parallel Lines, Spirits Having Flown, Private Dancer, Janet, Believe, Bolo Ta Ra Ra.., Human Clay, Laundry Service, and Back to Black, have not been included. 

As a result of the methodology that the American and Canadian certification-awarding bodies (the RIAA and Music Canada respectively) use, each disc in a multi-disc set is counted as one unit toward certification, leading to many double albums on the list—such as Pink Floyd's The Wall and the Beatles' The Beatles (White Album) —being certified with a number double the number of copies sold there. Such albums have the certifications for the number of copies (not discs) shipped indicated. Conversely, the American certification level for double albums that fit onto one compact disc, such as the Saturday Night Fever soundtrack reflect the actual number of copies sold. In 2016, RIAA included streaming in addition to track sales and album sales based on the concept of album-equivalent unit for certification purposes, and certification therefore no longer reflects shipment alone. For example, in the update of the certification for Their Greatest Hits (1971–1975) by the Eagles in August 2018, the album was certified 38× Platinum (increasing from the previous 29× Platinum certification in 2006) based on the new criteria, making it then the album with the highest certification in the United States.

Michael Jackson's Thriller, estimated to have sold 70 million copies worldwide, is the best-selling album ever. Jackson also currently has the highest number of albums on the list with five, Celine Dion has four, while  the Beatles, Pink Floyd, Madonna and Whitney Houston each have three.

Groupings are based on different sales benchmarks, the highest being for claims of at least 40 million copies, and the lowest being for claims of 20–29 million copies. Albums are listed in order of number of copies sold. If two or more artists have the same claimed sales, they are then ranked by certified units and thereafter by the artist's first name. Markets' order within the table is based on the number of compact discs sold in each market, largest market at the top and smallest at the bottom.

Legend

40 million copies or more
*All sales figures are shown in millions

30–39 million copies 
*All sales figures are shown in millions

20–29 million copies 
*All sales figures are shown in millions

Timeline of the best-selling albums 

Notes

Best-selling album by year worldwide
The charts of the best-selling albums by year in the world are compiled by the International Federation of the Phonographic Industry annually since 2001.  These charts are published in their two annual reports, the Digital Music Report and the Recording Industry in Numbers. Both the Digital Music Report and the Recording Industry in Numbers were replaced in 2016 by the Global Music Report.

In 2022, for sales of albums in 2021, IFPI reported three formats of sales chart, the Global all-format chart which includes all physical sales, digital downloads and streaming numbers, newly created Global vinyl album chart counting vinyl physical sales, combination of physical sales and digital downloads as Global album sales chart.

See also 

 Album era
 List of best-selling albums by women
 List of best-selling albums by country
 List of best-selling music artists
 List of best-selling remix albums
 List of best-selling singles
 List of best-selling singles by country
 Lists of albums
 List of best-selling albums of the 21st century

Notes

References